Brian Alan Glencross OAM (1 May 1941 – 30 December 2022) was an Australian field hockey player and coach.  As a member of the Australian National Men's Hockey Team, he won a bronze medal and a silver medal at consecutive Olympic Games – the bronze at the 1964 Summer Olympics in Tokyo and the silver four years later, when Mexico City hosted the Games. As a player, he represented Australia from 1964 to 1974, playing in 93 games. He coached the Australian women's hockey team from 1980 to 1992. 

Glencross died after a long battle with neurological disease on 30 December 2022, at the age of 81.

Coaching results at major tournaments:

1981: 4th – World Cup
1983: 3rd – World Cup
1984: 4th – Los Angeles Olympic Games
1986: 6th – World Cup
1987: 2nd – Champions Trophy
1988: 1st – Seoul Olympic Games
1989: 1st – Champions Trophy
1990: 2nd – World Cup
1991: 1st – Champions Trophy
1992: 5th – Barcelona Olympic Games

Glencross was appointed the inaugural Australian Institute of Sport women's coach in 1984 and held the position to 1995.

Recognition
1968 – WA Sports Federation's Sportsman of the Year
1991 – Medal of the Order of Australia 
1991 – inducted into the Sport Australia Hall of Fame
1996 – inducted into the WA Hall of Champions.
2000 – Australian Sports Medal
2001 – Centenary Medal in 2001.
2008 – Hockey Australia Hall of Fame

Notes

References

External links
 

1941 births
2022 deaths
Australian male field hockey players
Australian field hockey coaches
Olympic field hockey players of Australia
Field hockey players at the 1964 Summer Olympics
Field hockey players at the 1968 Summer Olympics
Field hockey players at the 1972 Summer Olympics
Olympic silver medalists for Australia
Olympic bronze medalists for Australia
Field hockey people from Western Australia
Recipients of the Medal of the Order of Australia
Recipients of the Australian Sports Medal
Recipients of the Centenary Medal
Sport Australia Hall of Fame inductees
Olympic medalists in field hockey
People from Narrogin, Western Australia
Australian Olympic coaches
Australian Institute of Sport coaches
Medalists at the 1968 Summer Olympics
Medalists at the 1964 Summer Olympics
